Angula may refer to:

 Aṅgula, a measure equal to a finger's breadth
 Eel, a biological order of fish
 Nahas Angula, former Prime Minister of Namibia
 Helmut Angula